Bruno Leonel Vides (born February 20, 1993 in Salta, Argentina) is an Argentine footballer who currently plays for Danubio.

Titles
 Lanús 2013 (Copa Sudamericana)

References
 
 

1993 births
Living people
Argentine footballers
Argentine expatriate footballers
Association football forwards
People from Salta
Sportspeople from Salta Province
Juventud Antoniana footballers
Club Atlético Lanús footballers
Deportes Copiapó footballers
C.S. Emelec footballers
Club Atlético Sarmiento footballers
C.D. Universidad Católica del Ecuador footballers
Orense S.C. players
Club Atlético Huracán footballers
Danubio F.C. players
Primera B de Chile players
Argentine Primera División players
Ecuadorian Serie A players
Uruguayan Primera División players
Argentine expatriate sportspeople in Chile
Argentine expatriate sportspeople in Ecuador
Argentine expatriate sportspeople in Uruguay
Expatriate footballers in Chile
Expatriate footballers in Ecuador
Expatriate footballers in Uruguay